Delonix brachycarpa is a species of plant in the family Fabaceae. It is found only in Madagascar.

References

brachycarpa
Endemic flora of Madagascar
Taxonomy articles created by Polbot